Maida Parlow French (1891–1977) was a Canadian author and artist. Her works include Boughs Bend Over (1943), All This to Keep (1947), and the autobiographical Apples Don't Just Grow (1954). In 1967 she wrote Kathleen Parlow: A Portrait, a biography of her cousin, Kathleen Parlow.

References

20th-century Canadian women writers
Canadian women artists
20th-century Canadian non-fiction writers
Canadian women non-fiction writers
Canadian biographers
Canadian autobiographers

1891 births
1977 deaths